Fan Li is a Chinese-American biostatistician whose research includes causal inference and propensity score matching, and their application to comparative effectiveness research in health care. She is a professor in the Duke University Department of Statistical Science, with a secondary appointment in Duke's Department of Biostatistics and Bioinformatics.

Education and career
Li studied mathematics at Peking University, graduating in 2001. Despite knowing nothing of biostatistics, she was encouraged to apply to the biostatistics program Johns Hopkins University by biostatistician Ying Qing Chen, who had recently graduated from the program. She completed her Ph.D. at Johns Hopkins in 2006. Her dissertation, Statistical Designs and Analyses for Partially Controlled Studies, was supervised by Constantine Frangakis.

After postdoctoral research at the Harvard Medical School, she joined Duke University as an assistant professor in 2008. She was promoted to associate professor in 2015 and to full professor in 2021.

Li should not be confused with another (male) statistician named Fan Li, one of her former doctoral students at Duke, who became an assistant professor of biostatistics at Yale University.

Recognition
Li was named as a Fellow of the American Statistical Association in 2022.

References

External links
Home page

Year of birth missing (living people)
Living people
American statisticians
American women statisticians
Chinese statisticians
Chinese women scientists
Biostatisticians
Peking University alumni
Johns Hopkins University alumni
Duke University faculty
Fellows of the American Statistical Association